"4 My People" is a song by American rapper Missy Elliott. It was written by Elliott, Timbaland, Eve Jeffers, Nisan Stewart, Craig Brockman and Dante "D-Man" Nolan for her third studio album Miss E... So Addictive (2001). Production was helmed by Stewart and Nolan, with Elliott serving as a co-producer and Timbaland credited as an additional producer, with Eve having featured vocals.

The track was released as the album's fourth and final single on March 25, 2002, and peaked at number two in the Netherlands and number five in the United Kingdom due to heavy airplay of the Basement Jaxx remix. The song also peaked at number eight in Denmark, and within the top 40 of the charts in Germany, Switzerland, France and Sweden.

Critical reception
John Robinson from NME called "4 My People" a "four-to-the-floor straightahead dance record – even if it feels a bit on the random side in its construction. The house is bigged up." The Basement Jaxx remix of the song has been voted as one of 1001 Best Songs Ever by Q magazine.

Music video
Visuals for "4 My People" were initially released as the remaining half of the video for Elliott's prevous single "Take Away" (2001), directed by Dave Meyers. They feature Elliott dancing with a big American crowd in honor of the victims of the 9/11 attacks. An extended version of the clip was produced after "4 My People" was released as the fourth single from Miss E... So Addictive. It was released on March 9, 2002. In 2003, it was awarded the DanceStar Award in the Best Video category.

Track listings

Notes
 denotes co-producer
 denotes additional producer
 denotes remix producer

Credits and personnel

Craig Brockman – writer
Jimmy Douglass – engineer, mixing
Missy Elliott – co-producer, vocals, writer
Jesse Gorman – assistant engineer
Bernie Grundman – mastering
Bill Importico – engineer
Eve Jeffers – vocals (original version), writer

Edith Louis – assistant engineer
Tim "Timbaland" Mosley – additional producer, mixing, writer
Dante "D-Man" Nolan – producer, writer
Steve Penny – assistant engineer
Nisan Stewart – producer, writer
Grayson Sumby – assistant engineer
Tweet – additional vocals

Charts

Weekly charts

Year-end charts

Certifications

Release history

References

2001 songs
2002 singles
Elektra Records singles
Eve (rapper) songs
The Goldmind Inc. singles
Missy Elliott songs
Songs written by Craig Brockman
Songs written by Eve (rapper)
Songs written by Missy Elliott
Songs written by Nisan Stewart
Songs written by Timbaland
Hip house songs